Kamara is an African surname that is most common in Sierra Leone. It may refer to the following notable people:
Aboubakar Kamara (born 1995), French-Mauritanian footballer striker
Abubakar Kamara (born 1970), Sierra Leonean football player
Abu Bakar Kamara (born 1929), Sierra Leonean politician
Alhaji Kamara (born 1994), Sierra Leonean football player
Alpha B. Kamara (born 1978), Sierra Leonean sprinter
Amara Kamara (bborn 1988), American college football player
Alpha B. Kamara (born 1978), Sierra Leonean sprinter
Alvin Kamara (born 1995), American football running back
Azur Kamara (born 1996), American football player
Bingourou Kamara (born 1996), French football goalkeeper 
Boima Kamara, Liberian politician
Boubacar Kamara (born 1999), French footballer
Brima Kamara (disambiguation), multiple people
Chris Kamara (born 1957), English footballer and commentator
Dauda Kamara, Sierra Leonean politician
Diomansy Kamara (born 1980), Senegalese football player
Glen Kamara (born 1995), Finnish footballer
Hassane Kamara (born 1994), French-born football midfielder
Ibrahim Bobson Kamara (born 1975), Sierra Leonean football player
Ibrahim Kamara (born 1966) Ivorian football manager
Ib Kamara (born 1990) Sierra Leonean British-based fashion stylist and journalist
János Kamara (1927–2000), Hungarian communist politician
John Kamara (born 1988), Sierra Leonean football player
Kei Kamara (born 1984), Sierra Leonean footballer
Kisimi Kamara (1890–1962), Sierra Leonean village tailor 
Kunti Kamara (born 1974), Liberian rebel commander
Lansana Kamara (born 1992), Sierra Leonean footballer
Malvin Kamara (born 1983), English-born footballer
Mariam Kamara (born 1979), architect in Niger
Marjon Kamara (born 1949), Liberian diplomat and politician 
Masire Kamara, Sierra Leonean tea seller
Mohamed Kamara (footballer, born 1981), Sierra Leonean football player
Mohamed Kamara (born 1987), Sierra Leonean football player 
Mohamed Kamara (weightlifter) (born 1987), Sierra Leonean weightlifter
Mohamed Kamara (footballer, born 1999), Sierra Leonean football player
Musa Noah Kamara (born 2000), Sierra Leonean football player
Ola Kamara (born 1989), Norwegian football player
Osman Kamara (born 1987), Sierra Leonean swimmer
Paul Kamara (born 1956), Sierra Leonean journalist, football manager, and cabinet minister
Salamatu Kamara, Sierra Leonean educator, politician and women's rights activist
Sam Kamara (born 1997), American football player
Samura Kamara, Sierra Leonean politician and economist
Sheik I. Kamara, Sierra Leonean politician
Sheku Kamara (born 1987), English-born footballer, imprisoned for armed robbery
Sherry Kindo Kamara (born 1994), Dutch football player
Thaim Buya Kamara (born 1959), Sierra Leonean Urologist
Tibou Kamara, Guinean politician and journalist

See also
Camara (surname)

Surnames of Liberian origin
Surnames of Sierra Leonean origin